Last of the Summer Wine's twenty-first series aired on BBC One. Most of the episodes were written by Roy Clarke and produced and directed by Alan J. W. Bell.

Outline
The trio in this series consisted of:

First appearances

Ros Utterthwaite (2000–2005)
Tom Simmonite (2000–2010)
Mrs Avery (2000–2001)

Last appearances

Compo Simmonite (1973–2000)

List of Episodes
Millennium Special (2000)

Regular series

DVD release
The box set for series twenty one was released by Universal Playback in March 2012, mislabelled as a box set for series 21 & 22.

References

See also

Series 21 and 22 box set has been released on DVD for the first time

2000 British television seasons
Last of the Summer Wine series